Noble Sarkar (23 January 1922 – 8 December 2006) was a Trinidadian cricketer. He played in one first-class match for Trinidad and Tobago in 1942/43.

See also
 List of Trinidadian representative cricketers

References

External links
 

1922 births
2006 deaths
Trinidad and Tobago cricketers